Kristian Elster may refer to:
Kristian Elster (born 1841) (1841–1881), Norwegian writer, often called Kristian Elster d.e.
Kristian Elster (born 1881) (1881–1947), Norwegian writer, often called Kristian Elster d.y.

See also
Elster (disambiguation)